RAIDS Online is a free public crime map developed by BAIR Analytics. It aims to reduce information requests and improve trust between law enforcement entities and their public with data accuracy and transparency.

The map enables users to view nearby crime activity. Users can choose different data layers to see how demographics and socio-economic factors affect crime. Citizens or neighborhood watch groups can sign up for reports on their areas of activity.

Development 
Free RAIDS Online iPhone mobile app

Features
Automated data feed
Works with any RMS/CAD
Integrated tips
User guide
Data management for admins
Email alerts
Basic analytics
Embeddable widget for website
unlimited historic data
Hotspot maps
Free web tips
Proximity search
Data grid view of data
Temporal topology chart
Metadata/data transparency
Accuracy
Ability to upload data on any schedule

See also 
 Crime mapping

References

Northeast Columbia Patch –  Columbia Police to Use Online Crime Mapping Tool, published November 16, 2012.
Sonoma Valley Patch –  Sonoma County Sheriff Now Using Online Crime Mapping, published November 13, 2012.
NBC 17 –  Special Report: How safe are you?, published November 13, 2012.
ABC 15 –  Track crimes in your neighborhood: Website lets you search crimes near you, published November 13, 2012.
azcentral –  Phoenix police chief talks crime stats, published August 21, 2012.
nwa –  Crime Mapping May Help Residents Stay Safe, published October 11, 2012.
KTVZ –  Bend joins Redmond in online crime mapping, published October 1, 2012.
Reporter Herald –  Larimer County residents can access new crime mapping system, published October 1, 2012.
pressdemocrat –  Sonoma County Sheriff's Office unveils crime mapping tool, published November 20, 2012.

Crime mapping